"Darkling" is the 60th episode of Star Trek: Voyager, the 18th episode of the third season. This show focuses on the holographic Doctor, a self-aware computer program aboard the starship USS Voyager that is struggling with re-programming himself.

The episode debuted on UPN on February 19, 1997.

Plot
While Kes pursues a romantic interest, the Doctor attempts to improve his program by including elements of the personalities of various famous people that he admires, taken from holocharacters of them. However, the darker, less well-known sides of these people's personalities form a second, evil personality. This evil version of the Doctor attempts to murder an alien from the planet being visited by Voyager by pushing him off a cliff. The evil twin also temporarily paralyzes Lt. Torres when she discovers it. It later jumps off a cliff with Kes but is beamed back to Voyager while falling. At the end of the episode, the Doctor's program is restored to normal. As the episode concludes, the Doctor is heard reciting part of the Hippocratic Oath.

Reception
In 2017 this episode was noted as featuring scary or eerie Star Trek content. In 2018, TheGamer ranked this one of the top 25 creepiest episodes of all Star Trek series. They note a series of disturbing behaviors by the EMH program in this episode, and were disappointed that many of the program's malfunctions were not addressed.

Media releases
This episode was released on DVD on July 6, 2004, as part of Star Trek Voyager: Complete Third Season, with Dolby 5.1 surround audio. The season 3 DVD was released in the UK on September 6, 2004.

In 2017, the complete Star Trek: Voyager television series was released in a DVD box set , which included it as part of the season 3 discs.

References

External links
 

1997 American television episodes
Star Trek: Voyager (season 3) episodes
Television episodes written by Brannon Braga